Montclair Hospital Medical Center (MHMC) is a 102-bed acute care facility in Montclair, in the Pomona Valley of San Bernardino County, southern California.

MHMC is owned and operated by Prime Healthcare Services, Inc. (PHS), a hospital management company located in Ontario. PHS was founded in 2001 by Prem Reddy, who is its chairman of the board. PHS purchased the facility from AHMC Healthcare in 2006.

Services
 24-hour basic emergency
 Cardio-neuro
 Cardiovascular Lab
 Imaging services - Digital Filmless Radiology
 Clinical lab
 Critical care/Stepdown Unit
 Surgical services
 Pharmacy
 Outpatient Physical Therapy
 Bio-Medical
 Women's Care - Centers of Excellence

History

MHMC was founded in 1973 as Doctors Hospital- Montclair and operated by National Medical Enterprises, a predecessor of Tenet Healthcare, for several years before being sold in early 1995. In 2001, the facility changed ownership again when it was purchased by AHMC.  In 2006, AHMC divested MHMC to Prime Healthcare who operates the facility as Montclair Hospital Medical Center.

Awards and recognitions
 AstraZeneca Spirit of Humanity Award (2006) for providing medical assistance to children and adults without medical insurance
 Accreditation by JACHO

References

External links
 Official  Montclair Hospital Medical Center−MHMC website
 A project by OSHPD: MHMC hospital in the CA Healthcare Atlas 
 Prime Healthcare Services, Inc.
 Prem Reddy, MD, FACC, FCCP

Hospitals in San Bernardino County, California
Montclair, California
Prime Healthcare Services
Hospital buildings completed in 1973
Hospitals established in 1973